The following is a list of awards and nominations received by actor, comedian, musician, screenwriter and film producer Steve Martin.

Martin has received 13 Primetime Emmy Award nominations for his work on television. He won in 1969 for Primetime Emmy Award for Outstanding Writing for a Variety Series for The Smothers Brothers Comedy Hour. He also received five Grammy Awards, two for Best Comedy Album Let's Get Small (1978), and A Wild and Crazy Guy (1979), for Best Country Instrumental Performance for Foggy Mountain Breakdown (2001), Best Bluegrass Album for The Crow: New Songs for the 5-String Banjo (2009), and for Best American Roots Song for Love Has Come for You (2013).

He has received various accolades including six Golden Globe Award nominations for his leading film roles, two Screen Actors Guild Award nominations for Only Murders in the Building, and two Tony Award nominations for Bright Star.

Major Awards

Academy Awards

Emmy Awards

Golden Globe Awards

Grammy Awards

Screen Actors Guild Awards

Tony Awards

Other Awards

American Comedy Awards

Drama Desk Awards

MTV Movie & TV Awards

People's Choice Awards

Teen Choice Awards

Critics awards

Miscellaneous awards

Other awards and honors
1989: Honorary Doctor of Humane Letters degree from California State University Long Beach
2005: Mark Twain Prize for American Humor
2005: Disney Legend award
2007: 30th Annual Kennedy Center Honors
2011: International Bluegrass Music Association's Entertainer of the Year
2013: Academy Honorary Award
2015: AFI Life Achievement Award

Notes

See also
Steve Martin filmography

References

External links

Lists of awards received by American actor
Lists of awards received by American musician
Awards